Belle Fontaine is a communal section in the Croix-des-Bouquets commune in the Croix-des-Bouquets Arrondissement, in the Ouest department of Haiti.

See also
Croix-des-Bouquets, for a list of other settlements in the commune.

References

Communal sections of Haiti
Populated places in Ouest (department)